Thunder Squad is a special services unit of the National Police Agency in Taiwan, a highly trained SWAT unit established in 1985 to conduct high-risk arrests and other dangerous law enforcement duties.  This 200 man group is organized into small four-man elements, three of which make up an operating group.

Thunder Squad is also the name given to the SWAT tactical units of the county level police departments in the ROC (Taiwan). They are not to be confused with Taiwan’s NPA SOG who have similar uniforms but are completely different organisations; Thunder Squad being local where as the NPA SOG are on a national level.

History
In 1984 Gen Wego Chiang Secretary General of the Taiwan National Security Bureau in conjunction with Wu Bwo Hsiung, Minister of the Interior, issued a National Directive calling for the formation of the national SWAT Command to combat heavily armed criminals and organized crime gangs. 
ROC Marine Corps Chief of Staff Lt General Lo Chang became commissioner of the National Police Agency, and established the SWAT Training Headquarters at the First Security Corps special training base under the guidance of the NPA Training Division to select the protocols and training processes.

In 1985 American-Chinese Chris Mar was selected as first Chief Instructor. He  developed the Comprehensive Applied Close Combat and together with police officer Chen Jia Yur established the CQC Instructors and Demo team to train the National Police Agency SWAT Teams and in the Long-Term Police Instructors Close Combat Courses focusing on unorthodox tactics, Simultaneous Close Quarters Combat, Arrest and Defend procedure, SWAT Baton, Special Tactics Riot, and Advanced Rescue and Extraction.
In 2020 the NPA Thunder Squad participated in the annual Han Kuang exercise alongside special forces formations from the Military Police and Coast Guard as well as regular military.

See also
Airborne Special Service Company
Amphibious Reconnaissance and Patrol Unit
Republic of China Military Police Special Services Company

References

External links
  - Thunder Squad Training video

1985 establishments in Taiwan
Law enforcement in Taiwan
Non-military counterterrorist organizations
Special forces units of the Republic of China